A Commissioners' church is an Anglican church in the United Kingdom built with money voted by Parliament as a result of the Church Building Act 1818, and subsequent related Acts. Such churches have been given a number of titles, including "Commissioners' Churches", "Waterloo Churches" and "Million Act Churches". In some cases the Commissioners provided the full cost of the new church; in other cases they provided a grant and the balance was raised locally. This list contains the Commissioners' churches in London.

Key

Churches

See also 
 List of Commissioners' churches in eastern England
 List of Commissioners' churches in the English Midlands
 List of Commissioners' churches in Northeast and Northwest England
 List of Commissioners' churches in southwest England
 List of Commissioners' churches in Wales
 List of Commissioners' churches in Yorkshire

References 
Citations

Sources

 

 London
 Commissioners' churches
Commissioners' churches in London
Commissioners' churches
Commissioners' churches